This is a list of rivers in Zimbabwe. This list is arranged by drainage basin, with respective tributaries indented under each larger stream's name.

Rivers
Zambezi River
Luenha River
Mazowe River (Mazoe River)
Ruya River (Luia River)
Gairezi River (Cauresi River)
Messenguézi River (Umsengedsi River)
Mecumbura River (Mkumvura River)
Kadzi River
Manyame River (Panhame River) (Hunyani River)
Angwa River
Sanyati River (Umniati River)
Munyati River
Umsweswe River
Sebakwe River
Kwekwe River
Ngezi River
Mupfure River (Umfuli River)
Bumi River
Sengwa River
Sengwe River
Masumu River
Sebungwe River
Gwayi River
Shangani River
Gweru River
Vungu River
Mbembesi River
Umguza River
Deka River
Matetsi River
Pungwe River
Honde River
Buzi River
Lucite River
Save River (Sabi River)
Runde River (Lundi River)
Chiredzi River
Mutirikwe River (Mtilikwe River)
Mucheke River
Pokoteke River
Tokwe River
Tokwane River
Musavezi River
Ngezi River (Ingezi River)
Turwi River
Devure River 
Nyazvidzi River
Nyazwidzi River
Odzi River
Macheke River
Limpopo River
Changane River
Mwenezi River (Manisi River)
Mushawe River
Bubye River (Bubi River)
Mzingwane River (Umzingwani River)
Mtetengwe River
Tongwe River
Umchabezi River
Insiza River
Siwaze River
Inkankezi River
Inyankuni River
Ncema River
Shashe River (Shashi River)
Thuli River (Tuli River)
Mwewe River
Mtshabezi River
Mtshelele River
Shashani River
Mkolokwe River
Sansukwe River
Ramokgwebana River
Ingwizi River

Makgadikgadi Pan
Nata River

References
Prentice-Hall, Inc., American World Atlas 1985
U.S. Central Intelligence Agency 2002
GEOnet Names Server

Zimbabwe
Rivers